Nathalie Loriers (born 27 October 1966, Namur) is a Belgian jazz pianist and composer.

Music career
In 1991 Loriers formed her own quartet with Kurt Van Herck (saxophone), Philippe Aerts (double bass) and Mimi Verderame (drums). She also has her own trio with Salvatore La Rocca (double bass) and Hans van Oosterhout (drums). She won the 1999 Golden Django for best French-speaking artist.

She has worked with Philip Catherine, Toots Thielemans, Jeanfrançois Prins, Lee Konitz, Aldo Romano, Charlie Mariano, Christian Escoudé, David Linx, Diederik Wissels, Emanuele Cisi, Gianluigi Trovesi, Ivan Paduart, Jacques Pelzer, Laurent Blondiau, and Steve Houben.

Awards and honors
 Sax Prize, Jazz Critics Association, 1989
 Belga Prize, Brussels Jazz Rally, Best Soloist, 1990
 First Prize, Jazz Contest, 1991
 Django d'Or, 1999
 EuroDjango Award, Contemporary European Jazz Artist, 2000
 Bobby Jaspar Prize, Académie du Jazz, 2000

Discography
 Nymphéas (1991)
 Dance or Die (Igloo, 1993)
 Walking Through Walls, Walking Along Walls (Igloo, 1995) 
 Silent Spring (1999)
 Tombouctou (2002)
 Le Temps Retrouvé (2021)

References

External links
 Official site

Belgian jazz pianists
1966 births
Living people
People from Namur (city)
Belgian women musicians
21st-century pianists
Igloo Records artists
21st-century women pianists